Mohol is a taluka (town) and a municipal council in Solapur district in the Indian state of Maharashtra. It contains the Nagnath Temple, one of the most important for the Nagesh community.

List of villages in Mohol

References

Cities and towns in Solapur district
Talukas in Maharashtra